Doringnek Pass, or just Doringnek, is situated in the Eastern Cape, province of South Africa, on the regional road R335, between Addo and Somerset East.

Mountain passes of the Eastern Cape